Ernest Milner Barber (30 May 1895 – 29 February 1972) was an Australian rules footballer who played with South Melbourne in the Victorian Football League (VFL).

Barber, who played his junior football for Williamstown Juniors FC, was a forward for South Melbourne. He kicked 20 goals in 1918, his debut season, a total bettered by only two teammates that year. In just his 13th league game he played in a premiership, kicking a goal from the forward pocket in the 1918 VFL Grand Final win over Collingwood.

References

External links

1895 births
Australian rules footballers from Victoria (Australia)
Williamstown Football Club players
Sydney Swans players
Sydney Swans Premiership players
Australian military personnel of World War I
1972 deaths
One-time VFL/AFL Premiership players
People from Horsham, Victoria
Military personnel from Victoria (Australia)